Bagstone is a village in South Gloucestershire, England. Bagstone is on the B4058 between Rangeworthy and Cromhall.

References

External links

Villages in South Gloucestershire District